Lieinix nemesis, the frosted mimic-white, nemesis mimic white or falcate dismorphia, is a butterfly in the family Pieridae. It is found from Mexico to Peru. The habitat consists of mid-elevation cloudforests.

Adults are sexually dimorphic. The upper surface of the male forewing is black and spotted with creamy white. The female forewing is white with a black apical area and a black streak across the discal cell.

The larvae probably feed on Inga species, including Inga mortoniana and Inga densiflora. Full-grown larvae are dark green and covered with short hairs. Pupation takes place in a green chrysalis which is attached to the stem of the host plant at an angle of 45 degrees.

Subspecies
The following subspecies are recognised:
Lieinix nemesis nemesis (Ecuador)
Lieinix nemesis nayaritensis Llorente, 1984 (Mexico)
Lieinix nemesis atthis (Doubleday, 1842) (Mexico, El Salvador)

References

Dismorphiinae
Butterflies described in 1813
Pieridae of South America
Taxa named by Pierre André Latreille